Masood-ul-Hasan (born 22 December 1945) is a former cricketer who played first-class cricket for several teams in Pakistan between 1961/62 and 1977/78. He toured Australia and New Zealand in 1964/65 but did not play Test cricket.

Cricket career
An off-spin bowler and useful lower-order batsman, Masood-ul-Hasan made his first-class debut at the age of 15, taking 6 for 60 in the first innings for Karachi Greens against Karachi Whites in a Quaid-e-Azam Trophy match in November 1961. He was selected to play for Pakistan against a Commonwealth XI team in 1963-64, and visited Ceylon with a Pakistan A team in 1964/65, but with little success either time.

He toured Australia and New Zealand in 1964/65 with the Pakistan Test team but played in only five of the 14 first-class matches and none of the Tests. He bowled only 238 balls on the three-month tour, taking two wickets.

He hit his highest score of 97 in the final of the Quadrangular Tournament in 1968/69, helping Pakistan International Airlines win the first of their many championships. His best innings bowling figures were 6 for 40 for Pakistan International Airlines A against Rawalpindi in 1971/72, and his best match figures were 11 for 99 (5 for 56 and 6 for 43) for Pakistan International Airlines B against Railways in 1969-70.

References

External links
 
 

1945 births
Living people
Pakistani cricketers
Pakistan International Airlines cricketers
Karachi cricketers
Public Works Department cricketers
East Pakistan cricketers
People from Bharatpur, Rajasthan
Pakistani people of Rajasthani descent